John Lea may refer to:

 John Lea (criminologist), British criminologist
 John Lea (submariner) (1923–2015), Royal Navy officer
 John Lea (epidemiologist) (1782–1862), lay epidemiologist
 John McCormick Lea (1818–1903), American Whig politician and mayor of Nashville, Tennessee
 John Wheeley Lea (1791–1874), English pharmacist and sauce manufacturer